Pé de Plátano ("platanus tree") is a bairro in the District of Sede in the municipality of Santa Maria, in the Brazilian state of Rio Grande do Sul. It is located in east Santa Maria.

Villages 
The bairro contains the following villages: Parque Residencial Ouro Verde, Pé de Plátano, Vila Almeida, Vila Presidente Vargas.

Gallery of photos

References 

Bairros of Santa Maria, Rio Grande do Sul